John Hemphill (December 18, 1803 – January 4, 1862) was an American politician and jurist who served as Chief Justice of the Supreme Court of the Republic of Texas from 1841 to 1846 and of the Supreme Court of Texas until 1858, and a United States senator from Texas from 1859 to 1861. A member of the Democratic Party, he was one of the signatories of the Confederate States Constitution.

Early life
Hemphill's father was a Presbyterian minister, The Reverend John Hemphill, who emigrated to the United States from County Londonderry, northern Ireland. His mother, Jane Lind, was also Scots-Irish but was born in Pennsylvania, where they met and married. John Hemphill the younger was born in South Carolina. He was educated at Jefferson College, graduating in 1825. He studied or "read the law" with David McCloud and was admitted to the bar in South Carolina in 1829. Several years later, in 1838 Hemphill moved his practice to Texas after it became an independent republic. Realizing that it was strongly influenced by Spanish law, he learned Spanish and studied its laws in order to be successful in this new environment.

Career
A friend of Sam Houston, Hemphill was appointed and served as chief justice of the Supreme Court of the Republic of Texas from 1841 to 1846 and of the Supreme Court of Texas from 1846 to 1858, serving as the top jurist in the Republic of Texas and then in the State of Texas. During this period, Texas was an independent republic and then a state in the United States before the Civil War.

He was called the "John Marshall of Texas" for the role he played in the development of Texan law from the republic's early years, "laying the foundation of its judiciary system." The challenges were far beyond the law; Hemphill became known for an incident in which he fought Indian warriors who had attacked him in a courtroom while his court was in session.

Hemphill was considered an expert on Spanish and Mexican law, and he considered Spanish civil law to be superior to common law in many areas, especially in relation to the property. He is remembered for expanding women's rights so that women could inherit equally. He also supported homestead rights in adoption of principles of Spanish civil law. Hemphill was elected in 1858 to replace Sam Houston as United States senator from Texas when Houston would not support the right of states to secede from the United States. He served from 1859 to 1861.

As Texas was one of the first seven states to secede from the Union, Hemphill was among the fourteen United States senators expelled by Congressional resolution in 1861. He was subsequently chosen as a Texas delegate to the Provisional Confederate Congress, a position he held until his death in Richmond, Virginia.

Personal life
Hemphill never married. He lived with his slave Sabina for more than a decade and had two daughters with her. He arranged for their education, sending them in the late 1850s to the newly founded Wilberforce College in Ohio, considered a "training ground" for abolitionists before the Civil War. John Hemphill was a cousin of Charles Hare Hemphill, Lord Hemphill through his father, The Reverend John Hemphill.

Legacy
Hemphill and Hemphill County, Texas, are named after him.

See also
 List of United States senators from Texas
 List of United States senators expelled or censured

References

Further reading
 Timothy S. Huebner, The Southern Judicial Tradition:  State Judges and Sectional Distinctiveness, 1790–1890 (1999).

External links
 
 

1803 births
1862 deaths
19th-century American politicians
American people of Scotch-Irish descent
Burials at Texas State Cemetery
Chief Justices of the Republic of Texas Supreme Court
Democratic Party United States senators from Texas
Deputies and delegates to the Provisional Congress of the Confederate States
Expelled United States senators
Hemphill County, Texas
People from Chester County, South Carolina
People of Texas in the American Civil War
Signers of the Confederate States Constitution
Signers of the Provisional Constitution of the Confederate States
Texas Democrats
Washington & Jefferson College alumni